The 1st Grand National Assembly (VNS) was the former legislature of Bulgaria. The assembly was located at Tarnovo. It ran from 17 April to 26 June 1879. 

This legislature is a continuation of the Constituent National Assembly. There were 229 MPs. It is also known that the assembly elected the first monarch in Bulgaria, Alexander of Battenberg, which later became Alexander I.

The ceremony was attended by 231 MPs. The chairman of the assembly was Anthim I as chairman, Todor Ikonomov as deputy chairman, and Georgi Tishev as secretary. The power of MPs was limited.

See also 
Tarnovo Constitution
National Assembly (Bulgaria)

References 

National Assembly (Bulgaria)
Constituent assemblies
Government of Bulgaria